The Battle of Antietam half dollar was designed by William M. Simpson and minted in 1937 to commemorate the 75th anniversary of the Battle of Antietam. The obverse depicts Robert E. Lee and George McClellan, and the reverse shows Burnside's Bridge.

Inception
Similar to the Delaware Tercentenary half dollar, the reason for minting the commemorative was by the historical significance of the coin's subject rather than for profit as was the case with many contemporary commemorative coins. Both Washington County Historical Society of Hagerstown, Maryland, as well as the Antietam Celebration Commission had called for the minting of a commemorative coin to mark 75th anniversary of the Battle of Antietam. The bill authorizing the minting of the coin passed on June 24th and set a minimum of 50,000 coins to be minted. Additionally, taking into consideration the abuses perpetrated by previous commemorative coin programs, this legislation specifically required for the coins to be struck with a single design and at a single mint.

Preparation
Sculptor William Marks Simpson was hired to design the coin. Simpson had already previous designed two other commemorative coins, the Norfolk, Virginia, Bicentennial half dollar and the Roanoke Island, North Carolina half dollar.

Release
The minimum authorized mintage of 50,000 coins was struck and were sent to the Washington County Historical Society, which sold the coins for $1.65 a piece. However, due to scandals associated with commemorative coins from the previous year, collectors had begun to grow tired of commemorative issues. As a result, despite substantial advertising efforts, the coin was a poor seller; 18,000 coins were sold and the remaining 32,000 halves were returned to the Philadelphia Mint for melting. However, despite selling poorly, the commemorative program was entirely free of scandal.

References

External links
 

1937 establishments in the United States
Bridges in art
Cultural depictions of Robert E. Lee
Currencies introduced in 1937
Early United States commemorative coins
Fifty-cent coins
Aftermath of the American Civil War
Half Dollar
George B. McClellan